Cedrik-Marcel Stebe won the first edition of the tournament after defeating Dudi Sela 6–2, 6–4 in the final.

Seeds

Draw

Finals

Green group
Standings are determined by: 1. number of wins; 2. number of matches; 3. in two-players-ties, head-to-head records; 4. in three-players-ties, percentage of sets won, or of games won; 5. steering-committee decision.

Yellow group
Standings are determined by: 1. number of wins; 2. number of matches; 3. in two-players-ties, head-to-head records; 4. in three-players-ties, percentage of sets won, or of games won; 5. steering-committee decision.

References
Main Draw

Finals
2011 Singles
2011 in Brazilian sport